Valdivia National Reserve is a federal nature reserve in the coastal mountain area of Los Ríos Region, in Chile.

Geography
It is located in the Valdivian Coastal Range of the Chilean Coast Ranges System. It is near the port of Corral.

The nature reserve is bordered on the south by the Valdivian Coastal Reserve; and on the north by the Alerce Costero Natural Monument.

The park protects Valdivian temperate rainforest habitats.

See also

References

National reserves of Chile
Protected areas of Los Ríos Region
Chilean Coast Range
Valdivian temperate rainforest